Adam Nash may refer to:

Adam Nash (savior sibling)
Adam Nash (executive)
Adam Nash, character in The Country of Marriage